Raphitoma bartolinorum is a species of sea snail, a marine gastropod mollusk in the family Raphitomidae.

Description
The length of the shell attains 6.6 mm.

Distribution
This marine species occurs in the Mediterranean Sea off Catania, Italy

References

 Giannuzzi-Savelli R., Pusateri F. & Bartolini S. (2018). A revision of the Mediterranean Raphitomidae (Gastropoda: Conoidea) 5: loss of planktotrophy and pairs of species, with the description of four new species. Bollettino Malacologico. 54, supplement 11: 1-77. page(s): 35-36, figs 38-39B

External links
 Biolib.cz: Raphitoma bartolinorum

bartolinorum
Gastropods described in 2018